Larry Ceisler is a prominent political operative in Pennsylvania, where he is the principal of Ceisler Media & Issue Advocacy.

A native of Washington, Pennsylvania, he is a graduate of American University and Duquesne University School of Law.

He worked as a news producer for KDKA-TV in Pittsburgh and was transferred to KYW-TV in Philadelphia in 1983. In 1986, he left the news business to work as a Deputy Campaign Manager for Philadelphia Mayor Wilson Goode. He then joined the Wilson administration as Special Assistant for Governmental Relations and Special Counsel for the Commerce Department.

He worked as a political analyst for WTXF-TV in Philadelphia from 1999 through 2005. He is also a regular political commentator on KYW-TV, CN8, and the Michael Smerconish Show on WPHT.

He testified in federal court as an expert witness in politics and testified against the GOP-created Pennsylvania redistricting plan.

In 2010, Politics Magazine named him one of the most influential Democrats in Pennsylvania.

In 2003, Larry Ceisler and Jeff Jubelirer formed the media advocacy firm Ceisler Jubelirer, LLC. Then in 2010 the name changed to Ceisler Media & Issue Advocacy when Jubelirer went on to pursue other avenues.

In 2015, it was announced that Ceisler Media and Issue Advocacy received a contract from the State of Israel. The agreement was a $90,000 test project to help Israel's image in the United States.

References

Year of birth missing (living people)
Living people
People from Washington, Pennsylvania
Pennsylvania Democrats
Duquesne University alumni
American University alumni
Pennsylvania political consultants
Foreign Policy Research Institute